A Wednesday! is a 2008 Indian Hindi-language thriller film written and directed by Neeraj Pandey and produced by Ronnie Screwvala, Anjum Rizvi and Shital Bhatia under UTV Motion Pictures and Friday Filmworks. The film stars Naseeruddin Shah and Anupam Kher, and set between 2 pm and 6 pm on a Wednesday, the film depicts a confrontation between a police commissioner and an anonymous caller who threatens to detonate bombs throughout Mumbai if four terrorists are not freed from police custody.

The film was released on 5 September 2008 and emerged as a commercial success. It was also granted tax exemption in the state of Maharashtra. Subsequently, it won a number of awards including the Indira Gandhi Award for Best Debut Film of a Director at the 56th National Film Awards. It went on to be remade in Tamil and Telugu simultaneously as Unnaipol Oruvan and Eenadu (both 2009), and as an English-language Sri Lankan film A Common Man (2013).

Plot
Mumbai police commissioner Prakash Rathod describes in a voice-over that he is going to retire the following day. He goes on to describe the most challenging case he faced in his career.

An unnamed man carries a travel bag, assumed to contain explosives, in the Chatrapati Shivaji Terminus railway station and proceeds to hide the bag in the restroom of a police station opposite the Mumbai Police headquarters. He then goes to the rooftop of a building under construction where he set up his base of operations, equipped with sim cards, mobile phones, and other gadgets. He calls Rathod and informs him that he has placed five bombs in locations throughout Mumbai and has programmed them to explode simultaneously within four hours unless the Commissioner gives in to his demands and releases four terrorists. Rathod alerts his team to trace the location of the caller. The caller tips off television news reporter Naina Roy, telling her it is going to be "the most important day of her life".

The four terrorists demanded by the caller are rounded up by police officers Arif and Jai. Police depute a young hacker named Anuj to track the location of the caller. The caller asks the two police officers to leave the four militants near a bench on a Juhu Aviation Base runway, but Arif leaves only three behind and takes one of them, Ibrahim Khan, captive as he suspects that the caller would not reveal the locations of the bombs even after the militants are released.

A phone placed under the bench rings and an explosion occurs, killing the three terrorists. The anonymous caller reveals he does not belong to any terrorist organization, and his plan was not to free the terrorists but to kill them. The caller, being just a "stupid common man wanting to clean his house", sought to avenge the terrorist attacks they had helped carry out in major cities in India, specifically the 2006 Mumbai train bombings. His final demand is that the officers kill Ibrahim themselves or he will set off all five bombs in Mumbai. Rathod indirectly orders Arif and Jai to kill Ibrahim and make it look like it was done in self-defense.

After the death of Ibrahim is confirmed on the news, the caller calls Rathod for a final time to reveal that he has not planted any other bombs in the city. Rathod declares he already knew there were no more bombs hence his decision to kill the last terrorist was not taken in fear but in confidence. Rathod reaches the caller's location just as the caller is leaving, having destroyed all his equipment. The two meet briefly when Rathod, identifying the caller on the basis of a face sketch, offers the man a ride home.

In a voiceover, Rathod says the man told him his real name, but he does not wish to reveal it since doing so would give away the man's religion. Rathod admits that he knew the caller was disturbed because of the incompetence of the governing authorities, but he never imagined a common man would go to such lengths to achieve this end. He also notes that the facts of this incident cannot be found in any written record but only in the memories of those who actually witnessed it, and further acknowledges that although the incident has ambiguous moral significance, he personally feels that whatever happened, happened for the best.

Cast
 Anupam Kher as Prakash Rathod, Commissioner of Mumbai Police
 Naseeruddin Shah as "The Common Man"
 Jimmy Sheirgill as Inspector Arif Khan, ATS
 Aamir Bashir as Inspector Jai Pratap Singh
 Deepal Shaw as Naina Roy, UTV Journalist
 Parag Tyagi as Inspector Aakash Duraivanshi
 Alok Narula as Raj Sharma; Naina Roy's Cameraman
 Rohitash Gaud as Ikhlaque Ahmed (A terrorist)
 Kali Prasad Mukherjee as Ibrahim Khan (A terrorist)
 Mukesh S Bhatt as Khurshid lala (A terrorist) 
 Vije Bhatia as Mohd. Zaheer (A terrorist)
 Chetan Pandit as Chief Minister Sunil Nigvekar
 Rajendra Chawla as Jaishankar Tiwary; Chief Minister's Assistant
 Gaurav Kapoor as Arjun Khanna (Actor); Special Appearance
 Virendra Saxena as Officer In-Charge (O.C) Baburao Patil at Colaba Police Station.
 Snehal Dabi as Shambhu a.k.a. Electric Baba
 Aayam Mehta as Shankar Patil; Chief Minister's Assistant
 Apurva Mehrotra as Anuj Sharma; The Hacker
 Shakti Bharti as Inspector Jai Pratap Singh's wife
 Vicky Ahuja as a middleman who supplied RDX
 Namrata Sawhney as The Common Man's wife; VOICE OVER

Soundtrack

Music composition by Sanjoy Chowdhury with lyrics inscribed by Irshad Kamil & Bulleh Shah. The soundtrack album is released under T-Series label. 6 Songs In Album, But No-one Features In Movie.
"Theme Song" - N/A
"Bekali" - Javed Ali
"Bulleh Shah" - Tochi Raina
"Bulleh Shah - Remix" - Tochi Raina
"Jalwa" - Shaan
"Nazar Lage Na" - Shaan, Mahalakshmi Iyer
"Parwazen" - Shaan

Production
From casting to completion, A Wednesday! took about eight months. It was filmed on location around Mumbai in 28 days. The terrorist's 'workstation' was an actual under-construction 25-storey building; it was chosen from 50 other such buildings for its clear view of the Mumbai skyline. Since the building had no elevators, a trolley lift was installed; Shah walked up the 25 floors every day. Shah mentioned in an interview that it was the first film of his career where he did not change a single word. He was first offered Kher's role.

Though a work of fiction, the script was inspired by the 11 July 2006 Mumbai train bombings. In fact, the incidents that followed the bombings were used as details in the plot.

After finishing the script, Pandey sent it to Anupam Kher and Naseeruddin Shah, who were his only choice for the two principal characters. Once both accepted the roles, he approached the producer Anjum Rizvi who liked the subject and the casting. Meanwhile, UTV Motion Pictures heard of the project, took it on, and bought the film's rights from Rizvi and Pandey.

Release
The release was delayed because UTV's own production, Mumbai Meri Jaan (2008), also based on the Mumbai train serial blasts, was scheduled for an August release. A Wednesday! was released in September alongside Hijack and Santosh Sivan's Tahaan.

Reception
A Wednesday! received critical acclaim with many comparing it to the movies of the Die Hard series. In a Tehelka review, while commending Neeraj Pandey for a tightly scripted film, "red herrings, finely etched characters", also noted "(for the film), the real Anupam Kher, whom we met in Saaransh, and the real Naseeruddin Shah, whom we knew from Bazaar and Mandi and Sparsh, both show up." The Times of India's critic Nikhat Kazmi called the movie "an intelligent diatribe against terrorism, refreshingly packaged as a racy thriller, reminiscent of the Die Hard Series." Rony D'Costa of Box Office India gave it 3 stars out of 5, stating "it will take just 100 minutes of your time but will give you an exciting & enriching movie going experience. A good watch, any day of the week."

Noted critic Rajeev Masand of CNN-IBN gave 4 out of 5 stars, and a positive review saying, "It's difficult to explain just how good A Wednesday is without giving away too much about the film. Because believe me, it's a film best seen without any impressions. It's a film whose charm lies in its unraveling". The Economic Times'''s critic, Gaurav Malani, wrote, "A Wednesday is one of those rare variety films about which one can't discuss much despite a strong desire for it could hamper your viewing experience as an unappraised audience. It's a film one wants to rave liberally about but even then you can't conveniently converse on the instances of acclaim since those are the moments of surreptitious surprise held in reserve by the director. It's the kind of film that is discussed in detail once it acquires the cult status." He also gave it 4 stars out of 5.

Anupama Chopra of NDTV thought the film to be a "provocative theatre. Its message is urgent and relevant but also disturbing and dangerous." She also felt what it suggested was "implausible".

Box officeA Wednesday! grossed around Rs 120 million in India. The film had a distributor share of Rs 44,600,000 in India. It gave satisfying results to the producers, distributors and exhibitors.

Awards and nominations

Remakes
The film was remade into Tamil and Telugu. The Tamil version had Kamal Haasan and Mohanlal in lead roles, while the Telugu version had Kamal Haasan and Venkatesh in the lead. 
 
UTV sold the rights of the film to Asia Media and Gemini Media, which remade it into A Common Man'', starring Ben Kingsley and Ben Cross.

References

External links
 
 

2008 films
2008 directorial debut films
2008 action drama films
2008 action thriller films
2008 crime drama films
2008 crime thriller films
2008 thriller drama films
2000s Hindi-language films
2000s vigilante films
Films scored by Sanjoy Chowdhury
Indian action drama films
Indian action thriller films
Indian crime drama films
Indian crime thriller films
Indian thriller drama films
Indian vigilante films
Hindi films remade in other languages
Films set in Mumbai
Films about organised crime in India
Films directed by Neeraj Pandey
Fictional portrayals of the Maharashtra Police
UTV Motion Pictures films
Best Debut Feature Film of a Director National Film Award winners
Films about terrorism in India